The Fargo station is a former railway station in Fargo, North Dakota. Built in 1898, it was listed on the National Register of Historic Places in 1975 as the Northern Pacific Railway Depot.

History
The station was built in 1898. It was designed by architect Cass Gilbert.

At the time of the station's construction, Fargo-Moorhead was served by both the Northern Pacific and the Great Northern Railroad.  This station was served by Northern Pacific trains, while the Great Northern operated its own station further north along Broadway.

End of service
In 1970, the two railway companies merged to form the Burlington Northern Railroad.  Freight trains used the Northern Pacific tracks, while passenger trains used the Great Northern tracks.  Therefore, passenger trains no longer stopped at the Northern Pacific station.

Historic designation
The station was listed on the National Register of Historic Places in 1975.

It is also included within the also-NRHP-listed Downtown Fargo District.

References

External links
Northern Pacific Railroad Depot–Fargo, at Cass Gilbert Society

Buildings and structures in Fargo, North Dakota
Railway stations in the United States opened in 1898
Railway stations on the National Register of Historic Places in North Dakota
Cass Gilbert buildings
Former Northern Pacific Railway stations
Railway stations closed in 1970
National Register of Historic Places in Cass County, North Dakota
Individually listed contributing properties to historic districts on the National Register in North Dakota
1898 establishments in North Dakota